With over 17,000 libraries and 2.5 billion materials circulated annually in the United States alone, libraries are a ubiquitous part of the American landscape. However, as libraries modernize, they face an increasingly harsh budget environment, as well as technological disruption in media, scholarship, and education. The political, social, and technological environment is one of transformation and uncertainty.

As of 2004, U.S. library usage was experiencing growth in spite of predictions to the contrary at that time. Instead, the impact of technology on libraries has been mixed. While usage of some library services, such as reference assistance, has declined, there has been a well-documented increase in the usage of public libraries in the U.S. and Canada over the last decade. Most libraries have added services such as public computers, free Wi-Fi, and digital materials such as web sites and e-books, leading to higher overall usage of the library. Counties and cities also continue to invest in library infrastructure. , library construction and renovation has remained steady. According to a 2013 survey by the Pew Internet and American Life Project, 54 percent of Americans ages 16 and older have used a public library in some way in the past 12 months. A similar poll of Britons, conducted in 2010, stated that 67 percent had visited a library within the last year. Over 94 percent of Americans say that "having a public library improves the quality of life in a community."

At the same time, public funding of libraries has declined. While libraries have a positive reputation, it is clear that citizens value other government services over libraries when budgets must be cut. School and academic libraries have also faced both severe budget troubles and declining usage of traditional library services like reference and interlibrary loan. Budget cuts and closures of publicly funded libraries in the Canada and UK have begun to affect the availability of library services in those countries.  A study conducted in 2014 revealed that number of visits to public libraries had dropped by approximately 12% since 2009, demonstrating the effects of this decline.   Library functions, services, and usage are changing so rapidly that it is difficult to establish standards or measures of value. As these trends continue or accelerate, the status of libraries is likely to remain dynamic and unclear. Most libraries are moving existing staff into information positions instead of employing new information custodians, making a developing interest for expert improvement opportunities. The scope of expert advancement open doors for bookkeepers to teach themselves in great information rehearses expanded all through 2015 and will keep on developing in 2016, essentially because of two activities. The library has for quite some time been in charge of social affair, arranging, and shielding significant data. Present day research and information accumulation has made some amazing progress from the days libraries were overseeing and getting to probably the most punctual dial-up online databases. Today, advanced information is gathered in such overpowering sums that one of the greatest difficulties lies essentially in investigating the data to discover significant ends in the excess of information. Building up, keeping up, and growing an internet based life nearness is vital for libraries. Gregg Dodd, Director of Marketing at Columbus Metropolitan Library, clarifies the estimation of a computerized procedure obviously, saying, "Our clients live in an advanced world, so this is an imperative space to interface with them."

Classification of Library Trends
 Trends will be organized into seven categories: 
 Society 
 Technology 
 Education  
 Environmental 
 Political
 Economics 
 Demographics

Academic libraries

College and university libraries are at the center of changes to the library system. Academic libraries must serve groups of users with diverse information needs and research skills. In addition to the structural challenges facing all libraries, academic libraries must also confront a rapidly changing educational and publishing environment, in which the value and cost of a university education is being questioned. A higher demand for accountability means academic libraries must prove their value and the value of the university system. Several institutions have attempted to assess the impact of academic libraries on student success, but have often struggled with student privacy concerns. The University of Minnesota recently published results of a major study on the impact of library use on student success. The study found that there are statistically relevant data showing first-year undergraduate students who use the library have a higher GPA for their first semester and higher retention from fall to spring than non-library users.

A decline in the use of traditional library services at the university level suggests that students are looking elsewhere for information. A 2005 report from the Association of Research Libraries (ARL) stated that between 1995 and 2004, reference requests dropped an average 4.5 percent per year, and book checkouts fell 1.2 percent per year, though this varied depending on the type of academic library. Master's level libraries saw an increase in research inquires during the same period. The ARL also documented a decline in reference requests and borrowing between libraries from 2009 to 2011. In 2007, regarding the issue, University of Illinois Graduate School of Library and Information Science professor Jerome McDonough observed that in terms of undergraduate usage, "We're losing clientele; students may come in the library to study, to socialize, to hit the newly installed cafe designed to lure them in, but they're not using library materials, or library services, at anything like the rate they did even ten years ago."

The increasing costs of access to academic journals, and the speed with which information resources are growing, suggests that academic libraries will not be able to maintain a traditional lending and accession model for much longer. Academic libraries are exploring a new model for service delivery, known as "digital commons" and/or "scholars' commons," that focuses on access, information quality, and information literacy as opposed to collecting a large number of print books and journals. Many campus libraries have remodeled their physical facilities in order to attract students, adding computers, cafes, classrooms, outlets, and study areas.

Many libraries are considering offering publishing services to academics under an open access model. The growing demand for publishing services suggests new roles and responsibilities for academic libraries in the future. The establishment or reestablishment of academic and university presses may offer a new economic model for academic libraries. A 2011 survey of member institutions of ARL, the Oberlin Group, and the University Libraries Group found that approximately half of the respondents had or were developing library publishing services. Copyright issues and technological limitations imposed by digital rights management are the strongest barriers to this transformation.

With changes on the horizon, the organizations that monitor academic library statistics are seeking new ways to assess value and impact. The Association of Research Libraries will no longer use monograph and serial costs as a metric, since "new data will be collected to more accurately reflect the modern environment of information management."

There is a connection with changes in academic libraries and Millennials, in fact it's the trend that's affecting libraries within the next five to ten years. "Millennials will have a significant impact on future user expectations. Researchers in the field of education are writing about how factors such as technology have a significant impact on how Millennials learn."  In a study done with 27 colleges and universities participating, it is revealed that a majority of students, specifically 73 percent, use the library less than the Internet. A couple explanations for this are that it's simply easier to surf the web and they (millennials) are better at surfing the web than a library's catalogue. In a study conducted by the article's, "Millennials and technology: putting suppositions to the test in an academic library," authors, Pascal Lupien and Randy Oldham, reveal that "our students do use the library in large numbers, and that they appear to understand that they must use a variety of resources, including academic sources, to conduct research."

Public libraries

The picture is somewhat clearer for public libraries, where there have been strong increases in both visits to libraries and the number of books borrowed over the last decade. A survey by the Institute of Museum and Library Services (IMLS), the United States federal agency tasked with monitoring library usage, reported a 32.7 percent increase in physical visits between 2001 and 2010. The American Library Association also cited a significant increase in usage, with visits increasing 61 percent between 1994 and 2004. Similar growth was documented in Canada, where overall library usage surged 45 percent between 2000 and 2009, including a 16 percent increase in book borrowing. Even in countries that have documented a decline in the use of public libraries, public support for libraries remains strong. Visits to libraries in the UK have declined 6.7 percent in the past five years, but 80 percent of Britons still view libraries as "essential" or "very important."

Recent growth in public library usage is likely driven by the Great Recession, as patrons take advantage of affordable entertainment, internet access, job search assistance, and educational resources. According to a 2011 Harris Poll Quorum, library patrons believe their usage of public libraries will remain steady or increase in the future. They report strong satisfaction with library services. Public library patrons value access to printed books and traditional reference services. Among Americans ages 16 years and older, 80 percent say borrowing books is a "very important" service libraries provide, and 80 percent say reference librarians fall into the same "very important" category. Library Journal noted a small but marked decrease in print circulation in 2012, and suggested that changing information behavior, an improving economy, budget cuts or some combination of these factors have begun to affect book borrowing.

In recent years, American libraries have also experienced an increase in Federal spending. In March 2018, the US Congress passed a bill that included significant increases in federal spending towards libraries. Part of this new spending bill provides $27 million for the Innovative Approaches to Literacy (IAL) program, and $5.7 million for the Library Services and Technology Act.

Beginning with the digitization of library catalogs between the 1970s and 1990s, libraries have added digital capabilities while continuing to provide traditional book lending and literacy services. , 98 percent of libraries offer free wireless Internet to their patrons; 90 percent offer e-books for borrowing; and 98 percent offer formal or informal technology training. A large majority of libraries now use some kind of social media, like Facebook or hi5, to connect with patrons. The assistance of professional library staff is also valued by patrons. Over one-third of people who have ever visited a library say library staff had helped them use a computer or the Internet. In 2011, more than a quarter of all adults used a library for Internet access at some point. Free access to computers and the Internet is now nearly as important to library patrons as borrowing books. Fifty-five percent of Americans think libraries have done a good job keeping up with technological trends.

Libraries are also offering new recreation, entrepreneurial, and content creation opportunities. Libraries across the United States now lend musical instruments, tools, seeds, science equipment and information technology, like gaming consoles, laptops and e-readers. While media outlets describe this development as part of a struggle to say relevant in a digital age, librarians say it is an extension of the traditional services and programming public libraries offer their communities. In an interview with The Atlantic Wire about the trend, librarian and blogger Rita Meade said, "I think it's great that some libraries are able to lend out items other than books, because it shows that they are responding to the needs of their particular community. But again, I do not see it as a desperate move to stay relevant... We've got relevancy coming out of our ears."

While patrons still value access to printed books, libraries' shift to offering a wide range of digital, educational, social and entrepreneurial tools appears to be permanent. The model is now attracting significant public investment. Libraries are rapidly establishing public makerspaces and workspaces to promote collaboration and entrepreneurship. In 2011, the Fayetteville Free Library in New York state became the first public library to offer a makerspace. Many other libraries, including the Chicago Public Library and Washington DC's MLK Library now offer 3D printing, print presses, rapid prototyping and manufacturing services to patrons. In 2014, the L.A. Public Library will begin offering high school diplomas to students. In partnership with the University of Arizona, the Burton Barr Central Library in Phoenix, AZ is now offering a co-working space and business incubator. The rise of entrepreneurial and content creation spaces may offer alternative funding models for some public libraries.

The way patrons use library buildings is also changing. Libraries offered 3.75 million public programs in 2010, the equivalent of one free program per day in every public library in America. Mirroring an increase in overall library usage, attendance at library programs increased by 22 percent between 2004 and 2008. Most public libraries offer classes, literacy programs and storytimes for children. Some public libraries, like the New York Public Library, are adopting the "bookstore model," characterized by remodeling in favor of more comfortable and attractive reading and meeting spaces, a broad offering of both bestsellers and literary works, user-friendly organization systems and excellent customer service, often including the elimination of library fines.

Despite increasing usage, adoption of new technology and strong popularity among voters, public libraries are bearing the brunt of budget cuts, with both state and municipal support for libraries declining. As cities and states confront budget shortfalls, libraries are often required to reduce hours, staff and locations. Multimillion-dollar cuts to public libraries are frequently proposed across the country, and libraries in general have faced budget cuts over the last four years. When explaining the rationale for budget cuts, officials often cite the rise of new technologies and the availability of alternative sources of information. However, voters continue to support public library funding. In 2013, 41 measures for new library funding were approved by voters; 19 were rejected.

It has been argued that as library budgets are cut fewer people use them.

School libraries
With public funding declining for both libraries and schools, school libraries face severe economic troubles. The number of school librarians has declined, with many school librarians being laid off or assigned to other teaching duties. Between 2010 and 2011, salaries for new school librarians fell two percent. Moreover, the decline in school library services seems unlikely to end soon as schools seek ways to reduce costs and consolidate services. Of all libraries, school libraries seem most likely to feel the impact of cuts to library funding via sequestration.

A study by School Library Journal, using statistics from the National Center for Education Statistics (NCES) showed that, "students in states that lost librarians tended to have lower reading scores—or had a slower rise on standardized tests—than those in states that gained librarians," and this effect couldn't be accounted for by overall staff reductions. In 2012 a joint study by the Education Law Center, the Health Sciences Library Consortium, and the Pennsylvania School Librarians Association demonstrated that "for all students, those with full-time librarians are almost three times as likely to have 'Advanced' writing scores as students without full-time librarians." Nevertheless, school libraries will have to deal with shrinking budgets and changing roles for both librarians and libraries.

Some school libraries are using the budget crisis as a driver for innovation. Benilde-St. Margaret's School, a Catholic preparatory school, removed nearly all physical books from their school library in 2011. Physical books were relocated to classrooms or donated to developing countries. According to Sue Skinner, Benilde-St. Margaret's principal, the school's commitment to ensuring all students receive their own computer made the change possible. Close cooperation with public libraries also ensured that students still had access to printed books. "We weren’t saying no to hard copy books," Skinner said. "But let's not duplicate what public and other libraries have."

According to a 2013 Pew Internet and American Life Project study, 85 percent of Americans age 16 and older think school and public libraries should "definitely" coordinate more closely with each other. That statistic is matched among younger Americans. Eighty-seven percent of Americans under 30 also think public libraries should coordinate more closely with local schools.

See also
 Digital library
 Information science
 Librarian
 Library science
 Scholars' commons
 Bookless libraries

External links
Circ Shift: circulation statistics for U.S. libraries by LibraryJournal
Library total monthly circulation for the San Francisco Public Library

References

Library science
Social change